The House of Thani is the ruling family of Qatar, with origins tracing back to the Banu Tamim tribal confederation.

History and structure
The Al Thanis can be traced back to Mudar bin Nizar.  The tribe were settled at Gebrin oasis in southern Najd (present-day Saudi Arabia) before they moved to Qatar. Around the 17th century, the tribe lived in Ushayqir, a settlement north-east of Riyadh. They settled in Qatar around the 1720s. Their first settlement in Qatar was in the southern town of Sikak, and from there they moved north-west to Zubarah and Al Ruwais. They settled in Doha in the 19th century under their leader Mohammed bin Thani. The group was named after the father of Mohammad, Thani bin Mohammad.

The family is made of four main factions: Bani Qassim, Bani Ahmed, Bani Jaber, and Bani Thamer. As of the early 1990s, the number of the family members was estimated to be about 20,000.

In 1995, many royal family members staged a successful coup against the then King, King Khalifa Al Thani. His son, Hamad bin Khalifa Al Thani became the King. A few months later, there was a failed coup.

The leadership transitions in 1913, 1949, 1960, and 2013 were aII abdications. These abdications were to a nephew in one incident and sons in the others.

Rulers
List of Emirs:
Sheikh Thani bin Mohammad
Sheikh Mohammed bin Thani, Emir of Qatar (1851–1878)
Sheikh Jassim bin Mohammed Al Thani, Emir of Qatar (1878–1913)
Sheikh Ahmad bin Mohammed Al Thani, Ruled Qatar between 1898 and 1905 (after his brother abdicated in favor of him) until he was killed in 1905.
Sheikh Mohammed bin Jassim Al Thani, Emir of Qatar (1913–1914)
Sheikh Abdullah bin Jassim Al Thani, Emir of Qatar (1914–1949)
Sheikh Ali bin Abdullah Al Thani, Emir of Qatar (1949–1960)
Sheikh Ahmad bin Ali Al Thani, Emir of Qatar (1960–1972)
Sheikh Khalifa bin Hamad Al Thani, Emir of Qatar (1972–1995)
Sheikh Hamad bin Khalifa Al Thani, Emir of Qatar (1995–2013)
Sheikh Tamim bin Hamad Al Thani, Emir of Qatar (2013–present)

Family tree

Jassim bin Mohammed Al Thani Branch

Sheikh Jassim bin Mohammed Al Thani (ca. 1825–1913) Founder of modern Qatar
 Sheikh Fahad bin Jassim Al Thani I (19th century, died when he was young)
 Sheikh Khalifa bin Jassim Al Thani (1851–1931)
 Sheikh Thani bin Jassim Al Thani (1856–1943), Sheikh of Al Gharafa
 Sheikh Abdulrahman bin Jassim Al Thani (1871–1930), Sheikh of Al Wakra
 Sheikh Abdullah bin Jassim Al Thani (1880–1957), Former Sheikh of Al Rayyan, Ruler of Qatar (1914–1940, 1948–1949)
 Sheikh Ali bin Jassim Al Thani (19th century, died when he was young)
 Sheikh Mohammed bin Jassim Al Thani (1881–1971), Sheikh of Umm Salal Mohammed
 Sheikh Jassim bin Muhammed bin Jassim Al Thani
 Sheikh Fahad bin Jassim Al Thani (19th century–1977)
 Sheikh Faisal bin Fahad Al Thani
 Sheikh Hamad bin Fahad Al Thani
 Sheikh Abdullah bin Fahad Al Thani
 Sheikh Nasir bin Jassim Al Thani
 Sheikh ??? bin Nasir Al Thani
 Sheikh ??? bin Nasir Al Thani
 Sheikh ??? bin Nasir Al Thani
 Sheikh ??? bin Nasir Al Thani
 Sheikh ??? bin Nasir Al Thani
 Sheikh Abdulaziz bin Jassim Al Thani (19th century–1970)
 Sheikh Khalid bin Jassim Al Thani
 Sheikh Fahad bin Khalid bin Jassim Al Thani
 Sheikh ??? bin Khalid Al Thani
 Sheikh Hamad Bin Jassim Al Thani
 Sheikh ??? bin Hamad Al Thani
 Sheikh ??? bin Hamad Al Thani
 Sheikh Abdulrahman bin Jassim Al Thani
 Sheikh ??? bin Abdulrahman Al Thani
 Sheikh ??? bin Abdulrahman Al Thani
 Sheikh ??? bin Abdulrahman Al Thani
 Sheikh ??? bin Abdulrahman Al Thani
 Sheikh Ali bin Jassim Al Thani
 Sheikh Abdullah bin Jassim Al Thani
 Sheikh ??? bin Abdullah Al Thani
 Sheikh ??? bin Abdullah Al Thani
 Sheikh ??? bin Abdullah Al Thani
 Sheikh ??? bin Abdullah Al Thani
 Sheikh Khalifa bin Jassim Al Thani (1959)
 Sheikh Jassim bin Khalifa Al Thani
 Sheikh Mohammed bin Khalifa Al Thani
 Sheikh Sultan bin Khalifa Al Thani
 Sheikh Ahmed bin Khalifa Al Thani
 Sheikha Najla bint Khalifa Al Thani
 Sheikha Reem bint Khalifa Al Thani
 Sheikh Salman Bin Jassim Al Thani
 Sheikh ??? bin Salman Al Thani
 Sheikh ??? bin Salman Al Thani
 Sheikh ??? bin Salman Al Thani
 Sheikh Saud Bin Jassim Al Thani
 Sheikh ??? bin Saud Al Thani
 Sheikh ??? bin Saud Al Thani
 Sheikh ??? bin Saud Al Thani
 Sheikh ??? bin Saud Al Thani
 Sheikh Sultan bin Jassim Al Thani, Married
 Sheikh Faysal bin Jassim Al Thani
 Sheikh ??? bin Faysal Al Thani
 Sheikh Hasan bin Jassim Al Thani
 Sheikh ??? Hamid Mohammed
 Sheikha Noor bint Jassim Al Thani, Married
 Sheikha Rowdha bint Jassim Al Thani, Married to Abdullah bin Ahmad Bin Abdullah
 Sheikha Amna bint Jassim Al Thani, Married to Khalid bin Hamad bin Abdullah
 Sheikha Al-Anoud bint Jassim Al Thani, Married, with 2 sons and 2 daughters
 Sheikha Tamather bint Jassim Al Thani
 Sheikha Fatma bint Jassim Al Thani
 Sheikha Muna bint Jassim Al Thani
 Sheikha Jawaher bint Jassim Al Thani
 Sheikha Sheikha bint Jassim Al Thani
 Sheikha Maha bint Jassim Al Thani
 Sheikha Moneera bint Jassim Al Thani
 Sheikha Khowla bint Jassim Al Thani
 Sheikha Leena bint Jassim Al Thani
 Sheikha Loolwa bint Jassim Al Thani 
 Sheikha Mariam bint Jassim Al Thani
 Sheikha Noora bint Jassim Al Thani
 Sheikh Ghanim bin Jassim Al Thani (1880s 2nd millennium)
 Sheikh Ali bin Jassim Al Thani II (1893–1972), Sheikh of Umm Salal Ali
 Sheikh Fahad bin Jassim Al Thani II (19th century, died young)
 Sheikh Fahad bin Jassim Al Thani III (1897-ca.1980), Sheikh of Al Khiesa, settled in Rumeliah and Adba
 Sheikh Abdulaziz bin Jassim Al Thani (1896–1985), Sheikh of Al Markhiya
 Sheikh Salman bin Jassim Al Thani (19th century, died during/soon after his birth)
 Sheikh Idris bin Jassim Al Thani (19th century, died during/soon after his birth)
 Sheikh Mubarak bin Jassim Al Thani (19th century, died during/soon after his birth)
 Sheikh Salman bin Jassim Al Thani II (1899–1984), Sheikh of Dukhan
 Sheikh Nasser bin Jassim Al Thani (1900s–1978), Sheikh of Nasiriya
 Sheikh Sultan bin Jassim Al Thani (1900s–1976), Sheikh of Umm Al Amad
 Sheikh Ahmed bin Jassim Al Thani (1900s–1995), Sheikh of Al Khor
 Sheikh Khawar bin Ahmed Al Thani  Emir of Al Khor since 1996
 Sheikh Fahad bin Khawar Al Thani
 Sheikha ??? bint Khawar Al Thani
 Sheikha ??? bint Khawar Al Thani
Sheikh Jassim bin Mohammed Al Thani (ca. 1825–1913) Founder of Modern Qatar
Sheikh Muhammed bin Jassim Al Thani- De facto ruler 
Sheikh Jassim bin Muhammed bin Jassim Al Thani
Sheikh Ahmed bin Mohammed Al Thani
Sheikh Abdullah bin Mohammed Al Thani
Sheikh Saoud bin Abdullah bin Mohammed Al Thani
Sheikh Thamir bin Mohammed bin Jassim Al Thani
Sheikh Ghanim bin Mohammed Al Thani
Sheikh Thani bin Mohammed Al Thani
Sheikh Abdulrahman bin Mohammed Al Thani
Sheikh Khalid bin Mohammed Al Thani
Sheikh Khalifa bin Mohammed Al Thani
Sheikh Mubarak bin Mohammed Al Thani
Sheikh Musa'id bin Mohammed Al Thani
Sheikh Hassan bin Mohammed Al Thani
Sheikh Mansoor bin Mohammed Al Thani
Sheikh Falih bin Mohammed Al Thani
Sheikh Jabor bin Mohammed Al Thani
Sheikh Ali bin Mohammed Al Thani
Sheikh Saud bin Mohammed Al Thani
Sheikha Fatima bint Mohammed Al Thani
Sheikha Sarah bint Mohammed Al Thani
Sheikha Loulwa bint Mohammed Al Thani
Sheikha Hessa bint Mohammed Al Thani
Sheikha Sheikha bint Mohammed Al Thani
Sheikha Noura bint Mohammed Al Thani
Sheikh Ali bin Jassim Al Thani
Sheikh Abdullah bin Jassim Al Thani – Ruler
Sheikh Ali bin Abdullah Al Thani – Ruler
Sheikh Ahmad bin Ali Al Thani – Emir
Sheikh Abdelaziz bin Ahmed Al Thani (1945–2008), ex-crown Prince (in-exile)
Sheikh Muhammed bin Ali Al Thani
Sheikh Abdullah bin Mohammed Al Thani (Sharjah) 
Sheikh Saud bin Muhammed Al Thani 
Sheikh Hassan bin Abdullah Al Thani
Sheikh Sultan bin Hassan bin Abdullah Al Thani
Sheikh Abdulrahman bin Sultan bin Hassan Al Thani
Sheikh Sultan bin Abdulrahman Al Thani
Sheikha Sara bint Abdulrahman Al Thani
Sheikh Hamad bin Abdullah Al Thani – Crown Prince (died before his father)
Sheikh Ahmed bin Hamad Al Thani
Sheikh Saud bin Ahmed Al Thani, (born 1969) former Qatari footballer
Sheikh Jassim bin Hamad bin Abdullah Al Thani
Sheikh Hamad bin Jassim bin Hamad Al Thani
Sheikh Abdelaziz bin Hamad Al Thani
Sheikh Saud bin Abdelaziz bin Hamad Al Thani
Sheikh Mohammed bin Hamad bin Abdullah Al Thani
Sheikh Khalid bin Hamad Al Thani
Sheikh Abdullah bin Khalid Al Thani
Sheikh Hamad bin Khalid Al Thani
Sheikh Suhaim bin Hamad Al Thani
Sheikh Hamad bin Suhaim Al Thani
Sheikha Jawaher bint Hamad Al Thani
Sheikh Khalifa bin Hamad Al Thani – Emir
Sheikh Abdelaziz bin Khalifa Al Thani
Sheikh Abdullah bin Khalifah Al Thani
Sheikh Hamad bin Khalifa Al Thani – Emir till 25 June 2013
Sheikh Mishaal bin Hamad Al Thani – Heir Apparent (till 1996)
Sheikh Jasim bin Hamad Al Thani – Heir Apparent (till 2003)
Sheikh Tamim bin Hamad Al Thani – Emir from 25 June 2013
Sheikh Joaan bin Hamad Al Thani
Sheikh Mohammed bin Hamad Al Thani
Sheikh Khalid bin Hamad Al Thani
Sheikh Abdullah bin Hamad Al Thani – Deputy Emir
Sheikha Alanoud bint Hamad Al Thani
Sheikh Thani bin Hamad Al Thani
Sheikh Khalfa bin Hamad Al Thani
Sheikh Fahad bin Jassim Al Thani
Sheikh Jassim bin Fahad Al Thani
Sheikh Saud bin Fahad Al Thani
Sheikh Hassan bin Fahad Al Thani
Sheikh Mubarak bin Fahad Al Thani
Sheikh Faleh bin Fahad Al Thani
Sheikh Nasser bin Fahad Al Thani
Sheikh Abdulrahman bin Jassim Al Thani
Sheikh Thani bin Jassim bin Muhammed Al Thani
Sheikh Muhammed bin Thani Al Thani
Sheikh Thamir bin Muhammed bin Thani Al Thani
Sheikh Hamad bin Thamir Al Thani

The Ahmed bin Muhammed Al Thani Branch
 Sheikh Thani bin Mohammed
 Sheikh Mohammed bin Thani
 Sheikh Ahmed bin Muhammed Al Thani – Governor of Doha
Sheikh Saif bin Ahmed Al Thani
Sheikh Ahmed bin Saif Al Thani
Sheikh Saif bin Ahmed Al Thani
Sheikh Mohammed bin Ahmed Al Thani
Sheikh Khalifa bin Ahmed Al Thani
Sheikh Nasser bin Khalifa Al Thani
Sheikh Abdullah bin Nasser bin Khalifa Al Thani, Prime Minister and Interior Minister of Qatar (2013)

The Jaber bin Muhammed Al Thani Branch
 Sheikh Jabr bin Muhammed Al Thani (1878–1934)
 Sheikh Muhammad bin Jabr Al Thani (1916–1983)
 Sheikh Jaber bin Muhammad Al Thani
 Sheikh Jassim bin Jaber Al Thani
 Sheikh Yousif bin Jassim Al Thani  
 Sheikh Jabor bin Jassim Al Thani 
 Sheikh Fahad bin Jassim Al Thani 
  Sheikh Hamad bin Jassim bin Jaber Al Thani (1959), Foreign Minister of Qatar (1992-2013), Prime Minister of Qatar (2007-2013) 
 Sheikh Jabor bin Hamad Al Thani 
 Sheikh Jassim bin Hamad bin Jassim bin Jaber Al Thani 
 Sheikh Mohammed bin Hamad Al Thani
 Sheikh Fahad bin Hamad Al Thani 
 Sheikh Tamim bin Hamad Al Thani 
 Sheikh Falah Bin Hamad Al Thani 
 Sheikh Falah bin Jassim Al Thani 
 Sheikh Mansoor bin Jassim Al Thani
 Sheikh Nawaf bin Jassim Al Thani

See also

 List of Emirs of Qatar
 List of Sunni Muslim dynasties
 Collecting practices of the Al-Thani Family

References

External links

Arab dynasties
Wahhabi dynasties
 
Banu Tamim